The MB.81 was a French military aircraft built by Société des Avions Marcel Bloch as a flying ambulance since it was designed to carry one passenger, in or out of a stretcher. Developed in response to a government-sponsored competition in support of the new doctrine of "aerial first aid", it was employed exclusively in the overseas colonies, specifically Morocco and Syria. Unlike the MB.80 prototype, the MB.81 had a closed cockpit and a somewhat larger cargo space. This was the company's first design to reach production.

History
The aircraft was designed to be able to seek patients or casualties by scouting, even at high altitudes, during military operations in mountainous countries, like then-French Morocco over the Atlas Mountains.

The main design feature made it possible to transport a casualty lying prone, in a compartment placed between the pilot and the engine. The wings could also be adapted to hold casualties, remaining constantly under the sight of the pilot and connected to him by an Aviaphone communication system.

The MB.80 made its first flight at the beginning of summer 1932 in  Villacoublay, piloted by Zacharie Heu. In a 1932 test, the MB.80 carried out 209 landings in thirty-six hours without any problems.

The aircraft was built without any assistance from the government, but an initial order of 20 was placed by the Ground French Forces (the French Armée de l'Air was founded in 1933), and it was one of the aircraft that relaunched Marcel Bloch in the aeronautical construction industry.

The production model, called the MB.81, was fitted with a French Salmson 9Nd of 128.68 kW (175 hp). It took part in military operations in Morocco and in Syria at the beginning of the 1930s.

The MB.81 entered service in 1935, and was used extensively throughout North Africa and the Middle East. A few were used in 1939-1940, before the French surrender, and in July 1941 in the battle for Syria between the Vichy French and the British/Free French.

Variants
MB.80
prototype (1 built)
MB.81
production version (20 built)

Operators

 Armee de l'Air
 Vichy France

Specifications

See also

References

External links

Dassault official home page

1930s French military rescue aircraft
Single-engined tractor aircraft
Low-wing aircraft
MB.81
Aircraft first flown in 1932